The 2009–10 Sporting de Gijón season was the second successive season that the club played in La Liga, the highest tier of football in Spain.

Overview
On 11 January 2010, Míchel was sold to Birmingham City for £3 million, becoming one of the highest transfers in the history of the Asturian club.

The club finally avoided relegation after achieving a 1–1 draw against Atlético Madrid at El Molinón in the 37th matchday.

Squad

From the youth squad

Competitions

La Liga

Results by round

League table

Matches

Copa del Rey

Matches

Squad statistics

Appearances and goals

|-
|colspan="14"|Players who appeared for Sporting de Gijón no longer at the club:

|}

References

External links
Profile at BDFutbol
Official website

Sporting de Gijón seasons
Sporting de Gijon